Polygona nemata is a species of sea snail, a marine gastropod mollusk in the family Fasciolariidae, the spindle snails, the tulip snails and their allies.

Description

Distribution

References

External links
 Woodring W.P.B. (1928). Miocene mollusks from Bowden, Jamaica. 2. Gastropods and discussion of results. Carnegie Institution of Washington Publication. 385: vii + 564 pp., 40 pls.

Fasciolariidae
Gastropods described in 1928